Moakümzük Tzüdir (born 16 October 1995) is an Indian cricketer. He made his List A debut on 4 October 2019, for Nagaland in the 2019–20 Vijay Hazare Trophy. He made his Twenty20 debut on 8 November 2019, for Nagaland in the 2019–20 Syed Mushtaq Ali Trophy.

References

External links
 

1995 births
Living people
Indian cricketers
Nagaland cricketers
Place of birth missing (living people)